Apsalus or Apsalos was a town of Almopia in ancient Macedonia.

The site of Apsalus is unlocated.

References

Populated places in ancient Macedonia
Former populated places in Greece
Lost ancient cities and towns